Carson Soucy (born July 27, 1994) is a Canadian professional ice hockey defenceman currently playing for the  Seattle Kraken of the National Hockey League (NHL). He was selected by the Minnesota Wild, 137th overall, in the 2013 NHL Entry Draft.

Personal life
Soucy was born in Viking, Alberta, on July 27, 1994, to mother Debbie. Soucy grew up in Irma, Alberta. His father Mike Soucy previously played softball. Soucy's older brother Tyson also played ice hockey, last playing for the Elk Point Elks of the SaskAlta Senior Hockey League.

Playing career

Junior
Growing up in Alberta, Soucy competed at the Triple-A midget level until he was 18 before being cut from the Western Hockey League’s Edmonton Oil Kings. Following this, he played one season of junior A hockey with the  Spruce Grove Saints of the Alberta Junior Hockey League and assisted in their 2013 AJHL North Division regular season and playoff titles. During this time, he also competed in softball and was an outfielder during the 2012 International Softball Federation World Junior Championship for Team Canada. Upon returning from the softball tournament, Soucy suffered a torn MCL and missed numerous games to recover.

After experiencing a six inch growth spurt, which drew attention from American NCAA Division I schools, Soucy chose to play collegiate hockey for the Minnesota–Duluth Bulldogs in the National Collegiate Hockey Conference. Leading up to the 2013 NHL Entry Draft, Sousy was ranked 137th overall North American skaters by the NHL Central Scouting Bureau. He was eventually drafted 137th overall by the Minnesota Wild. His cousin Parker MacKay joined Soucy in Minnesota for two seasons.

Professional
On April 11, 2017, at the conclusion of his four year collegiate career, Soucy was signed to a two-year, entry-level contract with the Minnesota Wild. He was subsequently re-assigned to the Wild's American Hockey League (AHL) affiliate, the Iowa Wild, for the remainder of the 2016–17 season. Soucy was subsequently invited to the Minnesota Wild's Development Camp, where he was praised by Wild's Director of Player Development Brad Bombardir for his play during the camp who said: "Carson Soucy just continues to improve and get better every development camp, and this was his fifth development camp. He continues to be one of the most improved, year in and year out, so I was happy with him." After attending the Wild's training camp, Soucy began the 2017–18 season with the Iowa Wild. After playing 67 games in the AHL, accumulating 15 points and a team-leading plus-12 rating, Soucys was recalled to the NHL level on April 2 following an injury to Ryan Suter. He made his NHL debut against Edmonton that night, registering three shots and two hits in 15:26 of time on ice. He became the fifth player to make his NHL debut with the Wild that season before being re-assigned to Iowa on April 6.

The following season Soucy failed to impress at the Wild's training camp and spent the entirety of the 2018-19 season in the AHL. When he returned to training camp for the 2019–20 season, he impressed Boudreau, who said: "This year, we didn’t know what to expect. And he came in and he was aggressive, and he moved the puck well, and he defended well. So it was all good." During this season, Soucy suffered an upper-body injury and was expected to miss 2-4 weeks to recover. On October 5, 2020, Soucy signed a three-year, $8.25 million contract extension to remain with the Wild.

On July 21, 2021, Soucy was selected from the Wild at the 2021 NHL Expansion Draft by the Seattle Kraken.

Career statistics

References

External links

1994 births
Living people
Canadian ice hockey defencemen
Iowa Wild players
Ice hockey people from Alberta
Minnesota Wild draft picks
Minnesota Wild players
Minnesota Duluth Bulldogs men's ice hockey players
Seattle Kraken players
Spruce Grove Saints players